Albury Park is a country park and Grade II* listed historic country house (Albury Park Mansion) in Surrey, England. The River Tillingbourne runs through the grounds. The gardens of Albury Park are Grade I listed on the Register of Historic Parks and Gardens.

Pre-1890

The Saxon Old St Peter and St Paul's Church, within the grounds of Albury Park, predates 1066. Albury Park was mentioned in the Domesday Book. Over the centuries the estate has changed hands many times.

The grounds of Albury Park were laid out by John Evelyn, the 17th century diarist and landscape gardener between 1655 and 1677. He lived nearby at Wotton. At this time the park was owned by Henry Howard who later became the 6th Duke of Norfolk. John Evelyn's work included a yew walk, a vineyard, a terrace  a quarter of a mile long, and  a 160-yard tunnel, through the hill under Silver Wood. Beneath the terrace was a chamber built in imitation of a Roman bath, with niches for sculpture. He also designed a wide canal fed by the River Tillingbourne; it was drained in the early nineteenth century. Many of Evelyn's alterations to the mansion  were destroyed in a fire in 1697. At that time the owner was Heneage Finch who later became the first Earl of Aylesford and Solicitor-General to Charles II. Finch rebuilt the mansion.

In 1761, Albury Park was the scene of the coronation banquet  of George III.

The house was owned by the immediate Finch family until 1782 when the 4th Earl of Aylesford sold the estate to his brother Captain William Clement Finch, a naval captain who had acquired a fortune by capturing a Spanish ship. Captain Finch wanted to enclose the park so he obtained magistrates' orders in 1784/5 to close and re-route a number of roads through the park. He enclosed the village green, incorporated part of the churchyard into the park grounds and harassed the villagers causing some of them to move away to a nearby hamlet which is now the village of Albury. 

In 1800, Captain Finch's widow sold the estate to Samuel Thornton, who made additions to the house, including  the north front, to the designs of John Soane. Albury Park was purchased by Baring's Bank partner, Charles Wall in 1811 and he lived at this estate with his wife Harriet (born Baring) and at their homes in London and Hampshire. Harriet organised evangelical meetings at the house which were scheduled for twice a day. The services attracted sizable congregations to hear the prayers and the readings from scripture. All of these were organised by Harriet and at some she would lead the service. Charles Wall died in 1815 and after that Harriet's focus moved to her new residence in Hampshire.

Henry Drummond was the owner in 1819. Drummond added a battlemented stone Gothick tower at the north-west corner of the building, and 63 brick chimneys – each to a different design. His architect was Augustus Pugin. Drummond also planted many of the rare trees in the park.

Post-1890
The Duke of Northumberland obtained Albury Park in 1890 and still owns most of the land, known as the Albury Estate.  The mansion contains 64 different mantelpieces, which were in part the work of Robert Adam. The private areas of the park contain a Roman bath and a cave inspired by the Grotto of Posilippo in Naples.

The building was converted into private flats that were  owned by the Country Houses Association until it went into liquidation in 2003. The house was then sold to private owners, who continued to let the flats, while living in the house themselves. The parkland and the John Evelyn gardens remain private.

Fly fishing is possible at Albury Park as part of the Albury Estate Fisheries fly fishing club. Park membership is based on a syndicate membership.

There is a public footpath that cuts through the estate.

The storms of 1987 and 1990 caused serious damage to parts of the park.

Albury Park was featured in a Channel 4 television series, Country House Rescue in December 2008, and November 2009.  The house and grounds have also been the location of the filming of the television series Midsomer Murders.

A report by Country Life in March 2020 indicated that the Grade II* listed mansion had been split into luxury apartments.

References

External links
Albury History Society
Multimap
Albury Estate Fisheries

Gardens in Surrey
Grade I listed parks and gardens in Surrey
Grade II* listed buildings in Surrey
Grade II* listed houses
Country houses in Surrey
1677 establishments in England